Cockatoo is a rural locality in the Shire of Banana, Queensland, Australia.

Geography

History
Cockatoo State School opened on 23 January 1984 and closed on 31 December 2000.

In the 2011 census, the population of Cockatoo was not separately reported but was included within neighbouring Taroom which had a combined population of 873 people.

Education
There are no schools in Cockatoo. The nearest school is Taroom State School in Taroom to the west which is a primary and secondary school to Year 10. There is no nearby secondary school to Year 12; distance education and boarding school are the alternatives.

Notable people
 Journalist Florence Eliza Lord was born in Cockatoo

References

External links 

Shire of Banana
Localities in Queensland